F. gardneri may refer to:
 Fucus gardneri, a seaweed species living on the littoral shore of the Pacific coasts of North America
 Fundulopanchax gardneri, the blue lyretail, steel-blue aphyosemion or Gardner's killi, a killifish species found in Nigeria and Cameroon

See also 
 Gardneri